Kruszynek-Kolonia  is a village in the administrative district of Gmina Koneck, within Aleksandrów County, Kuyavian-Pomeranian Voivodeship, in north-central Poland.

The village has a population of 110.

References

Kruszynek-Kolonia